Jean-Martin Folz (born 11 January 1947) is a French businessman. He was the chairman and CEO of PSA Peugeot Citroën from 1997 to 2007.

References

1947 births
Living people
French chief executives
École Polytechnique alumni
Mines Paris - PSL alumni
Corps des mines
Businesspeople from Strasbourg